Melanophidium wynaudense, commonly known as the Indian black earth snake, is a species of snake in the family Uropeltidae. The species is endemic to India.

Geographic range
M. wynaudense is found in the Western Ghats of southern India.

Type locality: "Cherambady in the Wynaud [= Wayanad]".

Description
Beddome (1864: 180) described M. wynaudense as follows:

"Scales round the body 15, round the neck 16 or 17; rostral scarcely produced back between the nasals; no supraorbital; muzzle more obtuse than in P. perrotteti; eye small; subcaudals 11 pairs; anal large, bifid; tail compressed; scales smooth, terminal spinose, tail ending in a single horny point.

Colour bluish black, with broad white blotches on the belly, which become larger and more numerous towards the tail; tail uniform bluish black."

Footnotes

Further reading

Beddome RH (1863). "Descriptions of New Species of the Family Uropeltidæ from Southern India, with Notes on other little-known Species". Proc. Zool. Soc. London 1863: 225-229 + Plates XXV-XXVII.
Beddome RH (1863). "Further Notes upon the Snakes of the Madras Presidency; with some Descriptions of New Species". Madras Quart. J. Med. Sci. 6: 41-48. (Plectrurus wynaudensis, new species).  [Reprint: (1940). J. Soc. Bibliogr. Nat. Sci., London 1 (10): 306-314.]
Beddome RH (1864). "Descriptions of New Species of the Family Uropeltidæ from Southern India, with Notes on other little-known Species". Ann. Mag. Nat. Hist., Third Series 13: 177-180.
Beddome RH (1886). "An Account of the Earth-Snakes of the Peninsula of India and Ceylon". Ann. Mag. Nat. Hist., Fifth Series 17: 3-33.
Boulenger GA (1890). The Fauna of British India, Including Ceylon and Burma. Reptilia and Batrachia. London: Secretary of State for India in Council. (Taylor and Francis, printers). xviii + 541 pp. ("Melanophidium wynadense [sic]", p. 272).
Günther ACLG (1864). The Reptiles of British India. London: The Ray Society. (Taylor and Francis, printers). xxvii + 452 pp. + Plates I-XXVI. ("Melanophidium wynandense [sic]", p. 194 + Plate XVII, figures I & I').
Smith MA (1943). The Fauna of British India, Ceylon and Burma, Including the Whole of the Indo-Chinese Sub-region. Reptilia and Amphibia. Vol. III.—Serpentes. London: Secretary of State for India. (Taylor and Francis, printers). xii + 583 pp. (Melanophidium wynaudense, p. 67).

External links
 

Uropeltidae
Reptiles of India
Reptiles described in 1863